The Nashville Sessions is a 1983 studio album by Dean Martin, produced by Jimmy Bowen. This was Martin's last album.

The album consists of country standards, recorded in country pop arrangements.

Martin sang two of the songs in duet, "My First Country Song" with Conway Twitty, and "Everybody's Had the Blues" with Merle Haggard.

Track listing
 "Old Bones" (John Hadley)
 "Everybody's Had the Blues" (Merle Haggard)
 "Don't Give Up on Me" (Ben Peters)
 "In Love Up to My Heart" (Chester Lester)
 "Shoulder to Shoulder" (Dallas Frazier)
 "Since I Met You Baby" (Ivory Joe Hunter)
 "My First Country Song" (Conway Twitty)
 "Drinking Champagne" (Bill Mack)
 "Hangin' Around" (Chip Hardy, Janis Carnes, Rick Carnes)
 "Love Put a Song in My Heart" (Ben Peters)

Personnel
Dean Martin - vocals
Reggie Young, Billy Joe Walker Jr. - guitar
Jimmy Capps - acoustic guitar
John Hughey, Sonny Garrish - steel guitar
David Hungate - bass
David Briggs, Alan Moore - keyboards
Buddy Spicher - fiddle
Kieran Kane - mandolin
James Stroud - drums
Denis Solee, Sam Levine - horns
Carol Chase, Dennis Wilson, Diane Tidwell, Donna Sheridan, Doug Clements, Gary Janney, Karen Taylor, Lisa Silver, Lori Brooks, Louis Nunley, Philip Forrest, Sherilyn Huffman, Terry Dearmore, Tom Brannon - backing vocals
Nashville String Machine - strings
Al De Lory - string arrangements
Carl Gorodetzky - concertmaster

References

External links

1983 albums
Dean Martin albums
Albums produced by Jimmy Bowen
Warner Records albums